You Know Me may refer to:

 You Know Me, a 2000 album by Jackie DeShannon
 "You Know Me" (2 Pistols song), a 2008 single by 2 Pistols featuring Ray J
 "You Know Me" (Robbie Williams song), a 2009 single by Robbie Williams
 You Know Me Movement